Tomáš Urban (born 22 June 1985) is a Czech professional ice hockey forward playing for HC Slovan Ústečtí Lvi of the Chance liga.

Career 
Urban made his Czech Extraliga debut playing with HC Bílí Tygři Liberec during the 2009–10 Czech Extraliga season. Previously played for HC Sareza Ostrava, HC VOKD Poruba, HC Benátky nad Jizerou and HC Bílí Tygři Liberec.

Career statistics

Regular season and playoffs

References

External links
 

1985 births
Living people
Czech ice hockey forwards
Sportspeople from Ostrava
HC RT Torax Poruba players
HC Benátky nad Jizerou players
HC Bílí Tygři Liberec players
BK Mladá Boleslav players
HC Nové Zámky players
MKS Cracovia (ice hockey) players
MsHK Žilina players
MHk 32 Liptovský Mikuláš players
HC Slovan Ústečtí Lvi players
Czech expatriate ice hockey players in the United States
Czech expatriate ice hockey players in Slovakia
Czech expatriate sportspeople in Poland
Expatriate ice hockey players in Poland